George Kobaladze (born 24 May 1976 in Tskhinvali, South Ossetian AO, Georgian SSR, Soviet Union) is a Georgian–Canadian weightlifter who has attained numerous successes at prestigious international competitions in the super-heavyweight category (+105 kg), including:

 gold medal and Commonwealth Games records (clean and jerk and total) at the 2014 Commonwealth Games in Glasgow, Scotland;
 silver medal at the 2015 Pan American Games in Toronto, Ontario, Canada;
 silver medal at the 2013 Pan American Championships in Isla Margarita, Venezuela;
 silver medal at the 2012 Pan American Championships in Antigua, Guatemala;
 bronze medal at the 2011 Pan American Games in Guadalajara, Mexico;
 bronze medal at the 2010 Commonwealth Games in Delhi, India

George Kobaladze is a seven-time Canadian champion and five-time Canada's Best Male Lifter (2014, 2013, 2012, 2011 and 2009).

The athlete currently holds the Canadian records in the superheavyweight class, with 175 kg lift in the snatch, 227 kg lift in the clean and jerk for a total of 402 kg (both lifts combined). These records were set at the 2014 Canadian Championships, held in Saskatoon, Saskatchewan. Kobaladze is the first Canadian weightlifter to lift 500 pounds (the 227 kg clean and jerk) and the first Canadian to cross the 400 kg line in the total.

At the 2013 World Championships held in Wrocław, Poland, the Canadian weightlifter earned 11th place.

In 2013, the Montrealer also participated in the very popular Arnold's Classic Sport Festival, where he ranked 2nd under the Sinclair formula.


Personal bests 

* Canadian Records
** Canadian and Commonwealth Record
*** Commonwealth Record

Records

References

 "George Kobaladze Profile". Canadian Olympic Committee, retrieved May 5, 2014
 "Interview with Canada’s strongest man, George Kobaladze". Firstpull.net, retrieved May 5, 2014 
 "Commonwealth Games Federation records".Commonwealth Games Federation, retrieved February 27, 2015
 "Weightlifting at the 2010 Commonwealth Games – Men's +105 kg", retrieved May 5, 2014
 "2013 COMMONWEALTH WEIGHTLIFTING FEDERATION RANKINGS". Weightlifting Scotland, retrieved May 5, 2014 
 "Commonwealth Games.ca – Heavy Lifting", retrieved August 14, 2014
 "Incredible Memories Being Created in Glasgow 2014". Canadian Heritage / Patrimoine canadien press release, retrieved August 14, 2014
 "Canada's George Kobaladze wins weightlifting gold at Commonwealth Games". The Globe and Mail, retrieved August 14, 2014
 "Commonwealth Games 2014: Weightlifting gold for Canada's George Kobaladze". NDTV Sports, retrieved August 14, 2014
 "2012 Commonwealth Weightlifting Federation Rankings". Australian Weightlifting Federation, retrieved May 5, 2014
 "International Weightlifting Federation – Results By Events", retrieved May 7, 2014

External links
  
 
 
 

1976 births
Living people
Canadian male weightlifters
Weightlifters at the 2014 Commonwealth Games
Commonwealth Games gold medallists for Canada
Medallists at the 2014 Commonwealth Games
Weightlifters at the 2010 Commonwealth Games
Commonwealth Games bronze medallists for Canada
Medallists at the 2010 Commonwealth Games
Commonwealth Games medallists in weightlifting
Weightlifters at the 2015 Pan American Games
Medalists at the 2015 Pan American Games
Pan American Games silver medalists for Canada
Pan American Games bronze medalists for Canada
Pan American Games medalists in weightlifting
Sportspeople from Montreal
Georgian emigrants to Canada
Male weightlifters from Georgia (country)